Clam shrimp are a group of bivalved branchiopod crustaceans that resemble the unrelated bivalved molluscs. They are extant and also known from the fossil record, from at least the Devonian period and perhaps before. They were originally classified in the former order Conchostraca, which later proved to be paraphyletic, due to the fact that water fleas are nested within clam shrimps. Clam shrimp are now divided into three orders, Cyclestherida, Laevicaudata, and Spinicaudata, in addition to the fossil family Leaiidae.

Characteristics 
Both valves of the shell are held together by a strong closing muscle. The animals react to danger by contracting the muscle, so that the valves close tightly and the crustacean, as if dead, lies motionlessly at the bottom of the pool.

In most species the head is dorsoventrally compressed. The sessile compound eyes are close together and located on the forehead; in the genus Cyclestheria they are truly fused. In front of them is a simple naupliar eye. The first pair of antennae is reduced and unsegmented. The second pair of antennae, however, is long and biramous. Both branches are covered with numerous bristles. The crustaceans swim primarily by swooping the antennae. In the common genus Lynceus, which can open its spherical valves wide, the thoracic legs move in an oar-like manner along with the antennae.

The number of segments constituting the thorax varies from 10 to 32, and the number of legs varies accordingly. They are similar in structure to the legs of tadpole shrimp, and similarly, their size decreases from front to back. In females, the outer lobes of several middle legs are modified into long, upward-bending threadlike outgrowths, used to hold the eggs on the dorsal side of the body under the shell. However, the main functions of the thoracic legs are respiration and carrying food forward to the mouth. The gills are basically the outer lobes of all thoracic legs that are closest to the base of the leg. The legs are in constant movement, and the water between the valves of the carapace is quickly renewed. The body ends in a large chitinised telson, which is either laterally compressed and bears a pair of large hooks, or dorsoventrally compressed, with short hooks.

Reproduction and development

Reproduction 
Clam shrimp have different reproductive strategies. For example, within the family Limnadiidae are found dioecious (male-female), hermaphroditic (only hermaphrodites), and androdioecious (male-hermaphrodite) species.

Life cycle 
The eggs are surrounded by a tough shell and can withstand drying out, freezing and other hostile conditions. In some species these eggs can hatch after as long as 7 years.

When the egg arrives in a suitable pool, a larva hatches out at the nauplius stage (the nauplius stage is absent in Cyclestherida). Clam shrimp nauplii are distinguished by very small front antennae. At the second stage (metanauplius), the larva develops the small shell. They develop very quickly. For instance, Cyzicus reaches sexual maturity in 19 days after hatching.

Taxonomy 
Extant clam shrimp belong to three orders, divided into five families; some notable genera and prehistoric taxa are also listed:

Spinicaudata Linder, 1945
 Cyzicidae Stebbing, 1910
 Caenestheria
 Caenestheriella
 Cyzicus
 Eocyzicus
 Eosestheriidae Zhang & Chen, 1976 (fossil)
 Bairdestheria
 Menucoestheria Gallego & Covacevich, 1998
 Euestheridae Defretin, 1965 (fossil)
 Laxitextella Kozur, 1982
 Leptestheriidae Daday, 1923
 Eoleptestheria
 Leptestheria
 Leptestheriella
 Maghrebestheria
 Sewellestheria
 Limnadiidae Baird, 1849 (including Imnadiidae)
 Eulimnadia
 Imnadia
 Limnadia
 Limnadiopsis
 Limnadiopsidum
 Metalimnadia
 Palaeolimnadiidae Tasch, 1956 (fossil)
 Krasiestheria Olempska, 2004 (tentatively placed here)

Cyclestherida Sars, 1899
 Cyclestheriidae Sars, 1899
 Cyclestheria
 Paracyclestheria
Laevicaudata Linder, 1945
 Lynceidae Baird, 1845
 Lynceiopsis
 Lynceus
 Paralimnetis

Geological history 
Modern clam shrimp have little significance to humans. However, extinct species of these crustaceans are often studied by geologists. In freshwater deposits, generally poor in fossils, the well-preserved clam shrimp shells are found quite often. They help identify the age of the corresponding strata. 	

During the past geological periods clam shrimp were apparently more numerous and diverse than they are now. 300 extinct species are known, and half as many living species. The oldest clam shrimp, such as Asmussia murchisoniana, were found in Devonian deposits. Many extinct species, mostly Triassic specimens, once lived in marine environments, where no extant clam shrimp inhabit today.

References

External links 

 
 Introduction to the Branchiopoda

Branchiopoda
Extant Devonian first appearances
Arthropod common names